Brendan Cowell is an Australian actor, playwright, and director.

Early life and education 
Cowell was born in Sydney and grew up in the beachside suburb of Cronulla. He credits his mother and high school drama teacher with encouraging him to explore his creative side.

He attended Charles Sturt University in Bathurst to complete a Bachelor of Arts in Theatre/Media.

Career

Stage 
Cowell won the Patrick White Playwrights' Award for his third play, Bed along with a collection of other awards. His play Ruben Guthrie showed at the Belvoir St Theatre in 2009 to sell-out houses. It had a new production at La Boite Theatre in 2011, starring Gyton Grantley and directed by David Berthold. 

He won some acclaim for his portrayal of the title role in Bell Shakespeare's 2008 Production of Hamlet and acted in Sydney Theatre Company's production of True West, directed by Philip Seymour Hoffman, in 2010. 

The Sublime (Melbourne Theatre Company) was shortlisted for the Nick Enright Prize for Playwriting in the New South Wales Premier's Literary Awards 2015.
His play Happy New was performed in London in 2013, starring Joel Samuels, Lisa Dillon and William Troughton. It had previously premiered in Australia.

In 2017 he starred as Galileo Galilei in the Young Vic's production of Bertholt Brecht's Life of Galileo.

Television 
Cowell played the enigmatic Tom on Australian cable TV's Love My Way, for which he also wrote several episodes, and played Todd for the first two seasons on Life Support on SBS TV, for which he also wrote sketches. 

In 2017 Cowell joined the cast of the HBO series Game of Thrones in Season 7 as Harrag, an Ironborn sea captain allied to Theon Greyjoy.

Film 
Cowell's acting work in film include roles in the 2007 crime drama Noise, the World War 1 war film Beneath Hill 60 and the romantic comedy I Love You Too.

Other writing 
In 2010 Cowell published his first novel, How it Feels.

Personal life
Cowell dated Rose Byrne for six years until they parted ways amicably in early 2010.

Filmography

Film

Television

Theatre

Writing

Directing credits

Awards and nominations

References

External links

Year of birth missing (living people)
Living people
Australian film directors
Australian male comedians
Australian male dramatists and playwrights
Australian male film actors
Australian male television actors
Australian screenwriters
Male actors from Sydney
People from the Sutherland Shire
Charles Sturt University alumni
20th-century Australian male actors
21st-century Australian dramatists and playwrights
21st-century Australian male actors
21st-century Australian screenwriters